Sundborn is a locality situated in Falun Municipality, Dalarna County, Sweden with 762 inhabitants in 2010.

The most famous resident was the painter Carl Larsson and his house (Little Hyttnäs) in Sundborn is a popular tourist attraction.

References

External links
Sundborn web site

Populated places in Dalarna County
Populated places in Falun Municipality